Tommaso Pio Boggiani O.P. (19 January 1863 – 26 February 1942) was an Italian prelate of the Catholic Church who had a varied career that included a stint as the Apostolic Delegate to Mexico, service as bishop of Adria and archbishop of Genoa, and senior assignments in the Roman Curia. He was a member of the Dominicans and was made a cardinal in 1916.

Biography
Pio Boggiani was born in Bosco Marengo, Alessandria, Italy, on 19 January 1863. He joined the Dominicans on 15 September 1879, changing his name from Pio to Tommaso. He was ordained a priest and worked as a missionary in Constantinople. He was elected prior of the Dominican convent in Ragusa in 1891. He served as pastor of the parish of S. Maria di Castello in Genoa in 1900 but left to join the faculty of the seminary in Genoa. In 1908 he was appointed apostolic administrator of the Diocese of Adria.

Pope Pius X appointed him bishop of Adria on 31 October 1908. He received his episcopal consecration on 22 November 1908 from Cardinal Rafael Merry del Val. 

He was named titular archbishop of Edessa di Osroene on 9 January 1912 and was named apostolic delegate to Mexico the next day. 

He was appointed apostolic administrator of Genoa on 7 March 1914. 

He served as secretary of the 1914 conclave that elected Pope Benedict XV.

Pope Benedict created him Cardinal-Priest of Santi Quirico e Giulitta at the consistory of 4 December 1916. 

He was appointed Archbishop of Genoa on 10 March 1919; he resigned that position in 1921. 

He participated in the 1922 conclave that elected Pope Pius XI. 

He opted the rank of Cardinal Bishop, taking the suburbicarian see of Porto e Santa Rufina on 15 July 1929. 

He took part in the 1939 conclave that elected Pope Pius XII. 

He died on 26 February 1942.

Notes

References

External links
 
 

1863 births
1942 deaths
20th-century Italian Roman Catholic archbishops
Bishops of Adria
Roman Catholic archbishops of Genoa
20th-century Italian cardinals
Dominican cardinals
Cardinal-bishops of Porto
Apostolic Nuncios to Mexico
Bishops of Edessa
People from Bosco Marengo